Jasper White (born 1954, New Jersey) is a "chef, restaurateur and cookbook author who is recognized as one of the leading authorities on New England food and its history, in particular seafood."

Early life and education
White credits his Italian grandmother for his interest in food.

He enrolled at The Culinary Institute of America in June 1975 and graduated in 1976.  In 1979, he met Lydia Shire, another aspiring chef. They worked together at many of the respected hotel dining rooms in Boston such as The Copley Plaza, The Parker House, and The Bostonian Hotel.  Shire considers White to be her mentor, and "her best cook friend in the world."

Restaurants
In 1983 he opened Jasper's, a restaurant on Boston's waterfront. It was here that he "carved out a niche in the local food scene deconstructing classics on his haute cuisine menu."  It was described as "a Boston, MA landmark famous for seafood and other New England specialties ... (leading) people who thought he was inextricably linked with upscale cuisine."  Jasper's closed in 1995. (He closed so he could spend time with his children)  For three years afterwards, he was a consultant to Legal Seafoods.

White opened Jasper White's Summer Shack in May 2000 in the Alewife section of Cambridge. The restaurant also has locations at Mohegan Sun and in Boston's Back Bay.  There is a seasonal location on Spectacle Island in the Boston Harbor.  The Summer Shack allowed him to "return to his culinary true love of hearty family-style cuisine: authentic and flavorful–not fussy (and) embrace his unpretentious roots."  Even though it is meant to be like a seaside clam shack, one gourmet dish from Jasper's is on the menu and it is the one for which he is most famous - pan roasted lobster.  Summer Shack was sold to the Lyons Group in 2017and White is no longer involved in the business.

Cookbooks
Jasper White’s Cooking from New England
Lobster at Home
Fifty Chowders
The Summer Shack Cookbook: The Complete Guide to Shore Food

Awards and honors
James Beard Foundation Award for Best Chef: Northeast.
In 2000, the James Beard Foundation nominated The Summer Shack for Best New Restaurant.

Personal life
Jasper and his wife Kathleen, live in the Boston area. They have 6 children and 2 grandchildren.

References

American cookbook writers
American male non-fiction writers
1954 births
Writers from New Jersey
Culinary Institute of America Hyde Park alumni
American restaurateurs
American male chefs
Restaurant founders
Living people
American chief executives of food industry companies
James Beard Foundation Award winners
Chefs from Massachusetts